NGC 1970 (also known as ESO 56-SC127) is a bright open cluster and emission nebula in the Dorado constellation in the Large Magellanic Cloud. It was discovered by John Herschel on January 31, 1835. Its apparent size is 8.0. It is commonly known as the Tulip Nebula.

See also 
 List of NGC objects (1001–2000)

References

External links 
 

Emission nebulae
Open clusters
ESO objects
1970
Dorado (constellation)
Large Magellanic Cloud
Astronomical objects discovered in 1835
Discoveries by John Herschel